Irene Chepet Cheptai (born 4 February 1992) is a Kenyan professional long-distance runner who competes in track and cross country running. She was the gold medallist at the 2017 World Cross Country Championships and led Kenya to the team title. Cheptai won the silver medal for the 10,000 metres at the 2022 Commonwealth Games.

Prior to that she was a junior silver medallist at the 2008 World Cross Country Championships and represented Kenya in the senior race in 2013 and 2015, winning team medals both times.

Career
Irene Chepet Cheptai made her international debut at the 2007 World Youth Championships in Athletics, where she ran a personal best of 9:22.05 minutes to place seventh overall in the 3000 metres. The following year she established herself internationally on grass by taking the silver medal in the junior race at the 2008 IAAF World Cross Country Championships, losing only to Ethiopia's Genzebe Dibaba in a sprint finish. She did not compete at a high level for several years after that and marked her entrance into the senior ranks with a seventh-place finish in the 5000 metres at the 2012 Kenyan Athletics Championships.

Cheptai began to make an impact at senior level in the 2013 season, starting with a runner-up finish at the Cross Internacional de Itálica and third place at the Cross Internacional Juan Muguerza. Second place to Margaret Muriuki at the Kenya Cross Country Championships brought on her selection for the senior national team, and finished tenth at the 2013 IAAF World Cross Country Championships (although only fifth best among the winning Kenyan team). She competed on the IAAF Diamond League track circuit for the first time that year and managed personal bests of 8:56.20 minutes and 14:50.99 minutes for the 3000 m and 5000 m respectively.

The 2014 season was a step back on the track for Cheptai, as she finished lowly in Diamond League races and failed to improve her bests. She did make progress in road running, however, coming second at the Groningen Four-Mile Run and Nairobi Diamond 10K Run, setting a best of 31:45 minutes at the latter. She began training with Turkish athletics club Üsküdar Belediyesi and brought the club victory in the individual and team categories at the European Champion Clubs Cup Cross Country. After winning the Discovery Kenya Cross Country, Cheptai was again selected for the Kenyan team for the 2015 IAAF World Cross Country Championships and reached a new high in seventh place, winning the team silver medal with Kenya. On the 2015 IAAF Diamond League circuit, she placed in the top six of the 5000 m at the Shanghai Golden Grand Prix, Prefontaine Classic and Bislett Games. A runner-up finish to Viola Kibiwott at the 2015 Athletics Kenya World Championship Trials earned her a place on her first senior track team for Kenya.

From the beginning of 2016, she started her collaboration with the Italian Coach Renato Canova, and during the season she achieved PB in both the 5000m (14:43.42) and 10,000m (31:15.38).

She won her first national title at the 2017 Kenyan Cross Country Championships.

At the 2017 IAAF World Cross Country Championships Cheptai won individual and team gold, in a historic event in which Kenya secured the top six positions in the senior women's race.

Personal bests
 1500 metres – 4:13.75 (Kortrijk 2014)
 3000 metres – 8:48.03 (Zürich 2015)
 5000 metres – 14:43.42 (Eugene, OR 2016)
 10000 metres - 30:44.00 (Tokyo 2021)
Road
 10 kilometres – 30:16 (Prague 2022)
 Half marathon – 1:06:42 (New Delhi 2022)

International competitions

National titles
 Kenyan Cross Country Championships
 Senior race: 2017

Notes
The athlete's name may also be rendered as Irine Chebet Cheptai.

References

External links

Living people
1992 births
Kenyan female long-distance runners
World Athletics Championships athletes for Kenya
Kenyan female cross country runners
Athletes (track and field) at the 2020 Summer Olympics
Olympic athletes of Kenya
Athletes (track and field) at the 2022 Commonwealth Games
Commonwealth Games silver medallists for Kenya
Commonwealth Games medallists in athletics
Medallists at the 2022 Commonwealth Games